The following were chiefs of the Wolf Clan of the Lenape (Delaware) tribe:
 Custaloga (to 1774)
 Captain Pipe (from 1774 to 1794?)
 Hockingpomska (from 1794? to unk.)
 Captain Pipe (younger) (from unk.-c. 1840) and Silas Armstrong (from c. 1800–1817)

See also
Lists of Native American people